Club Sportivo Luqueño is a Paraguayan football club, based in the city of Luque on the outskirts of the capital Asunción. The club has won two Paraguayan championships.

History
The club was founded in 1921 when three teams from the city of Luque (Marte Atlético, General Aquino and Vencedor) decided to merge and form one single club: Sportivo Luqueño. Only three years after its foundation, the team was already playing in the first division and fighting for the title. So far, Sportivo Luqueño has won three first division titles in the Paraguayan league, in 1951, 1953 and 2007.

For the 1999 Copa América, hosted by Paraguay, the club built a brand new stadium which seats 25,000, making it the third largest in Paraguay (after the Defensores del Chaco in Asunción and the Estadio Antonio Oddone Sarubbi in Ciudad del Este).

The fans of the club are very passionate and that can be seen when visiting the city of Luque, where basically everything is decorated by the club's colors (blue and yellow).

Club anthem
The official anthem of Club Sportivo Luqueño was created in the first decades of the club, where in a group of fanatical musicians and artists Luqueños, decided to make a club on the eve of the club's anniversary. On that occasion several music dedicated to the institution were revealed, in which I highlight the song presented by Luqueño Musician Juan Bautista Almirón. Thus causing the euphoria of all those present, who accompanied with palms and choirs.

Uniform and Sponsors
From the beginning the design was always vertical blue and yellow stripes, and sometimes used the shirt or shirt as an alternative half blue and the other yellow in the 50s. But the club's traditional design was always used, and It was constituted by blue and yellow vertical stripes, which with time would be the representative colors, which identifies the city of Luque.

On the chest a shield with the initial C.S.L. and three golden stars included in the late 90s, represent the three clubs that merged for the creation of the club "Athletic Mars", "The Winner" and "Gral. Aquino", with blue shorts and blue or yellow socks .

Nickname
The team is identified with the nickname of "Kuré Luque", because the city of Luque is famous for pigs (Kuré, which in the Guaraní means pig), and even the club owns a pig as a team mascot in the facilities. "KURÉ LUQUE" (Chancho Luqueño) due to an old anecdotic fact: the pigs were transported to Asunción in certain train carriages, which in football days were also used by fans and Sportivo Luqueño players. For this reason the fans of the opposite team said "There come the Kure Luque"

Honours
Paraguayan First Division: 2
1951, 1953 
 Torneo Apertura: 2007

Paraguayan Second Division: 4
1924, 1956, 1964, 1968

Performance in CONMEBOL competitions
Copa Libertadores: 3 appearances
First Round (3): 1976, 1984, 2008

Copa CONMEBOL: 2 appearances
Best: Quarter-Finals (1) in 1993
First Round (1) in 1997

 Copa Sudamericana (4): 2015, 2016 and 2017 2018
Best: Semifinals: 2015

Current squad
As of 18 June 2021.

-

Notable players
To appear in this section a player must have either:
 Played at least 125 games for the club.
 Set a club record or won an individual award while at the club.
 Been part of a national team at any time.
 Played in the first division of any other football association (outside of Paraguay).
 Played in a continental and/or intercontinental competition.

1920s
 Aurelio González (1920s)
1940s
 Juan Bautista Villalba (1941–1947)
 Dionisio Arce (1948–1949)
1950s
 José Parodi (1950–1955, 1957–1958)
 José Aveiro (1958)
1960s
 Modesto Sandoval (1960–1964)
1970s
 Juan Bautista Torales (1976–1981, 1993–1995)
 Julio César Romero (Romerito) (1977–1979, 1990–1991, 1993–1994, 1996)
  Raúl Vicente Amarilla (1978–1979)
1980s
 José Luis Chilavert (1982–1984)
1990s
 Francisco Ferreira (1991–93, 2001, 2002)
 Aristides Masi (1997, 1998–1999, 2001, 2002, 2005)
 Aldo Adorno (1998–2000)
2000s
 Luis Núñez (2000–2006, 2007–2008, 2010)
 Vidal Sanabria (2000)
 Albeiro Usuriaga (2002)
 Derlis Gómez (2002, 2004–2006)
 Miguel Ángel Cuéllar (2004–2005)
 Richart Báez (2005)
 Daniel Sanabria (2005)
 Alcidio Fleitas (2005)
 Ricardo Tavarelli (2005)
 Julio César Yegros (2005)
 Miguel Ángel Benítez (2006)
 Juan Fernández Di Alessio (2007)
 Juan Cardozo (2007)
2010s
 Carlos Humberto Paredes (2010)
  Javier Cohene (2010)
 Juan Pablo Raponi (2011)
 Nelson Cuevas (2012)
 Francisco Aldo Barreto Miranda (2014)
2020s
 Isidro Pitta (2020)
Non-CONMEBOL players
  Bertrand Tchami (1998–1999)
 Nobuhiro Takeda (2000)
  Seidou Aboubacar (2003)
 Guy Stéphane Essame (2004–2005)
 Tobie Mimboe (2004)
 Celestine Romed Ngah Kebe (2007–2008)
 Nouga Georges (2009–2010)
 Kenneth Nkweta Nju
 Hideaki Ozawa (2010)
 Sho Shimoji (2011)
 Yuki Tamura (2011)
 Bryan Lopez (2007–2013)
 John Alston Bodden (2014)
 Brad Norman (2020)
 Takayuki Morimoto (2021)

Managers
 Feliciano Caceres 1921
 Vessillo Bartoli (1950–1953)
 Aurelio Gonzalez (1967-1969)
 Carlos Arce (1975–1977)(1982)
 Silvio Parodi ( 1983)
 Raul Vicente Amarilla (1996)
 Julio Carlos Gómez 
 Ever Hugo Almeida (2006)
 Carlos Kiese (2007)
 Miguel Ángel Zahzú (2007–2009)
 Carlos Jara Saguier (Sept 28, 2010 – Dec 11, 2010)
 Guillermo Sanguinetti (Dec 9, 2010 – Feb 22, 2011)
 Rolando Chilavert (July 1, 2011 – Oct 17, 2011)
 Daniel Lanata (Dec 2011)
 Carlos Kiese (April 11, 2012 – July 3, 2012)
 Pablo Caballero (July 9, 2012 – March 4, 2013)
 José Cardozo (March 4, 2013 – May 8, 2013)
 Alicio Solalinde (April 30, 2013 – March 8, 2014)
 Eduardo Rivera (March 9, 2014– )
 Javier Sanguinetti (July, 2017– 2018)
 Pedro Sarabia (Oct,2018)
 Celso Ayala (2019–2020)
 Luis Fernando Escobar (2020–2021)
 Badayco Maciel (2021)
 Miguel Ángel Zahzú (2021–2022)

References

https://web.archive.org/web/20130921055128/http://www.clubsportivoluqueno.com.py/

External links

 
Football clubs in Paraguay
Football clubs in Asunción
Association football clubs established in 1921
1921 establishments in Paraguay